Myron Elmer "Max" Essex (born August 17, 1939) is the Mary Woodard Lasker Professor of Health Sciences, emeritus in the Department of Immunology and Infectious Diseases at Harvard University, Chair of the Harvard T.H. Chan School of Public Health AIDS Initiative (HAI) in the Department of Immunology and Infectious Diseases, and Chair of the Botswana–Harvard AIDS Institute in Gaborone, Botswana. Essex was one of the first to link animal and human retroviruses to immunosuppressive disease, to suspect that a retrovirus was the cause of AIDS, and to determine that HIV could be transmitted through blood and blood products to hemophiliacs and recipients of blood transfusions. With collaborators, Essex also provided the first evidence that HIV could be transmitted by heterosexual intercourse.

In 1984, Essex identified gp120, the virus surface protein that is used worldwide for blood screening, HIV detection, and epidemiological monitoring. With collaborators, including African microbiologist Souleymane Mboup, he discovered the first simian immunodeficiency virus, as well as HIV-2.  Since 1986, he has developed programs for AIDS collaboration in Senegal, Thailand, Botswana, India, Mexico, and China. In 1996, Essex helped establish the Botswana–Harvard Partnership for HIV Research and Education (now the Botswana–Harvard AIDS Institute). This is a collaboration between the Ministry of Health in Botswana and HAI.

Biography
Essex was born in Coventry, Rhode Island in 1939. Essex earned his DVM from Michigan State University in 1967. He earned his Ph.D. from University of California, Davis, in 1970.

He has been married to Elizabeth Essex since 1967.  They have two daughters and five grandchildren.

Essex holds ten honorary doctorates and 15 patents and has received the Lasker Award, the highest medical research award given in the United States, jointly with Robert Gallo and Luc Montagnier in 1986. He has published over 500 papers and 12 books, including two editions of AIDS in Africa, and his latest, Saturday Is for Funerals.  Essex has worked in twelve (12) different nations as a veterinarian and virologist: Botswana, China, Colombia, India, Japan, Nigeria, Senegal, Taiwan, Tanzania, Thailand, U.S., Zaire.

His 45 years of working papers, the Myron Essex papers, 1949–1996, are archived in the Countway Library's Center for the History of Medicine through funding by a Hidden Collections grant from the Harvard University Library (HUL) within The Maximizing Microbiology: Molecular Genetics, Cancer, and Virology, 1936-2000 project.  In addition to the Myron Essex papers (1949–1996), the project has already led to the processing of collections of several other microbiologists, including those of Bernard D. Davis, Arthur B. Pardee, Francesc Duran i Reynals, and Luigi Gorini.  Essex serves on the Library's Archives Committee.

He has been the primary mentor to eight (80) Postdocs and to 34 Doctoral students.  He has authored 629 research papers, forty (40) of which have been published in Science or Nature.

His 45 years of working papers, the Myron Essex papers, 1949–1996, are archived in the Countway Library's Center for the History of Medicine through funding by a Hidden Collections grant from the Harvard University Library (HUL) within The Maximizing Microbiology: Molecular Genetics, Cancer, and Virology, 1936-2000 project.  In addition to the Myron Essex papers (1949–1996), the project has already led to the processing of collections of several other microbiologists, including those of Bernard D. Davis, Arthur B. Pardee, Francesc Duran i Reynals, and Luigi Gorini.  Essex serves on the Library's Archives Committee.  In 2018 Dr. Essex announced his retirement plans.

Awards
 Elected member, Institute of Medicine (IOM) of the National Academy of Sciences (NAS, now NASEM)
 Fellow, American Academy of Microbiology
 HIV Lifetime Achievement Award for Scientific Contributions from the Institute of Human Virology (IHV) at the University of Maryland School of Medicine, November 2011
 Lifetime Achievement Award, AIDS Society of India, 2014 (in Kolkata).  The plaque reads “For his exemplary contribution towards research in HIV/AIDS and for his outstanding leadership in public health.”

Awards named for Max Essex
 Essex Fellowship for Students from Africa, Harvard T.H. Chan School of Public Health, annually since 2007

References

External links
Harvard T.H. Chan School of Public Health faculty page for Myron 'Max' Essex, DVM
Interview with Max Essex, Science Watch, May 1993
AIDS at 30: Hard Lessons and Hope, Harvard Public Health Review, Spring/Summer 2011
Harvard T.H. Chan School of Public Health AIDS Initiative list of Associated Researchers*Announcement of 1988 founding of HAI, the Harvard AIDS Institute - "Bok named Myron (Max) Essex, a virologist at the Harvard School of Public Health (HSPH), to lead the Institute. According to Essex, “HAI was the brainchild of Harvey Fineberg,” who was HSPH Dean at the time."
Harvard Catalyst Profile Page for Max Essex
Harvard AIDS Institute Profile Page for Max Essex
Coup E. Processing of the Myron “Max” Essex papers has begun. March 2, 2016.  Website of Center for the History of Medicine at Countway Library.
 Myron Essex Papers, 1949-1996 (inclusive), 1965-1996 (bulk). H MS c466. Harvard Medical Library, Francis A. Countway Library of Medicine, Boston, Mass.

American virologists
Living people
American public health doctors
Michigan State University alumni
University of California, Davis alumni
1939 births
HIV/AIDS researchers
Recipients of the Lasker-DeBakey Clinical Medical Research Award
American veterinarians
Male veterinarians
Harvard School of Public Health faculty
Botswana–United States relations
20th-century scientists
21st-century scientists